The Melon Music Awards is a major music awards show that is held annually by Kakao Entertainment (a Kakao company) through its online music store Melon. The event was initially a fan-voted award conducted entirely online from 2005 through 2008, and has been officially held offline in Seoul since 2009.

The award show uses digital data from the Melon music platform—along with online voting and judges evaluation—to base its awards to artists who have had exceptional performance during the year.

History 
The awards show underwent a logo rebranding starting with the 2019 edition. 2020 Melon Music Awards was held for 4 days from December 2 to 5, dubbed as "MMA Week", and was broadcast online due to government restrictions imposed because of the ongoing COVID-19 pandemic.

Host venues

Judging criteria

Grand prizes
The four grand prizes (known as daesangs):

 Artist of the Year
 Album of the Year
 Song of the Year

Main prizes

Top 10 Artist Award

New Artist of the Year Award

Genre Awards

Best Rap/Hip Hop

Best Ballad

Best R&B

Best Rock

Best Trot

Best Pop

Best Dance

Best Folk/Blues

Best Indie

Best OST

Best Performance

Best Performance

Popularity awards

Netizen's Choice Award

Hot Trend Award

Special awards

Music Video Award

Song Writer Award

Best Performance Director

Best Solo

Best Group

Best Collaboration

Global Artist

Global Rising Artist

Kakao Hot Star Award

Stage of the Year

1theK Performance Award

1theK Original Contents

Other awards

2009
 Star: TVXQ
 Mania: TVXQ - "Mirotic"
 Current Stream: Kim Tae-woo – "Love Rain"
 Smart Radio: Girls' Generation
 Odyssey: Girls' Generation – "Gee"
 Mobile Music: Girls' Generation
 Sudden Rise: Leessang
 Y-STAR Live: Lee Seung-chul

2010
 Best Dressed Singer: Girls' Generation
 Best MBC Radio Singer: Jung Yeop – "Without You"

2016
 Hall of Fame Award: Sechs Kies
 Tencent-QQ Music Asia Star Award: iKon

2020
 Best Drum: Shin Seok Cheol
 Best Bass: Choi Hoon
 Best Synthesizer: Hong So Jin
 Best Guitar: Juk Jae
 Best Chorus: Kim Hyun Ah

2021
 Best Music Style: Homies
 Project Music: MSG Wannabe M.O.M
 Best Session Instrumental Award: Kim Dong-min (Guitarist), Go Tae-yeong (Bassist), Gureum (Keyboardist)
 Legendary Performance: BTS – "IDOL"

2022
 Best Music Style: Big Naughty
 Project Music Award: WSG Wannabe
 1theK Global Icon: Enhypen
 KakaoBank Everyone's Star: BTS

Discontinued awards

Best Electronic

MBC Music Star Award

Performing Arts Award

Most wins

Most grand prizes awarded 

This list includes Artist of the Year, Album of the Year, Song of the Year, and Record of the Year Award.

Most awarded overall

Broadcasting

South Korea
 The 1st Melon Music Awards ceremony was broadcast through CU Media's y-star, Dramax and Comedy TV channels. Internet partners include Melon, Nate (then a sister brand), GOMTV and Afreeca TV (2009-2010).
 In 2010, LOEN Entertainment partnered with MBC Plus Media, and the latter transmitted the awards night through MBC every1, MBC Dramanet (from 2010-2011 and 2013), MBC Game (now defunct) and MBC Life (now defunct). When MBC Music was launched in 2012, it shared the honor of being the flagship station of MMA with MBC every1. MBC QueeN joined in 2013.
 Daum was the local internet partner in 2013. One year later, it merged with LOEN's incumbent parent company Kakao.
 In 2018, the awards show was broadcast on JTBC2, JTBC4, 1theK, and KakaoTV as part of their partnership with JTBC Plus Media.

Worldwide
 Since 2011, Alphabet Inc.'s YouTube (specifically the 1theK (formerly LOEN Music) channel) is the internet broadcast partner of Melon Music Awards. Microsoft's Zune was the first internet broadcast partner (2009).

China
 Tencent, via its QQ Music and QQ Live services, owns the broadcast rights since 2016.

Japan
 The Sony Music Japan-owned Music On! TV acquired the local broadcast rights in 2015, making Melon Music Awards the second Korean music awarding event that it broadcasts (the first being Mnet Asian Music Awards).

Thailand
 Joox, another Tencent-owned music service, together with its sister property Sanook.com, brought Melon Music Awards to its users in Thailand in 2016 and 2017.

Taiwan
 Streaming rights is handled by Taiwan Mobile's MyMusic service.

References

External links
   (LOEN)
   (MBC)
 

 
Kakao M
South Korean music awards
Awards established in 2009
Annual events in South Korea